The 1978 season was the Chicago Bears' 59th in the National Football League, and their first under head coach Neill Armstrong. The team failed to improve on their 9–5 record from 1977 to finish at 7–9, and failed to make the playoffs for the 14th time in the past 15 seasons.

Offseason

NFL Draft

Undrafted free agents

Roster

Schedule

Game summaries

Week 2 
"The 100 yards was nice, but it doesn't mean a thing since we lost." O. J. Simpson said after winning his first confrontation with Walter Payton. Simpson had 108 yards to Payton's 62. - But Simpson's fumble proved to be a pivotal one. He recovered the ball but lost 6 yards on the play, and the 49ers, leading by four points in the fourth quarter, had to go to the air to try to maintain possession. Doug Buffone then intercepts and Chicago wound up with the winning touchdown.

Week 3 
Television: CBS
Announcers: Tim Ryan and Johnny Morris
Chicago scored three times in about four minutes in the third quarter, including a 40-yard touchdown pass from Bob Avellini to James Scott as the Bears go 3-0 to stay in first place and extend their regular season winning streak to 9. The third quarter scoring barrage began with a 28-yard field goal by Bob Thomas at 10:41. Less than Three minutes later Tommy Hart tackled quarterback Greg Landry in the end zone for a safety. Then the Bears wrapped up the scoring with Avellini's 40-yard bomb to wide receiver James Scott over the head of cornerback James Hunter.

Week 6 at Packers

Week 16

Standings

References 

Chicago Bears
Chicago Bears seasons
Chicago Bears